Fenella Ephraim Mukangara (born 13 December 1955) is a Tanzanian CCM politician and a special seat Member of Parliament since 2010. She is the current Minister of Information, Culture and Sports.

References

1955 births
Living people
Chama Cha Mapinduzi MPs
Tanzanian MPs 2010–2015
Tanzanian Roman Catholics
Government ministers of Tanzania
Zanaki Secondary School alumni
Jangwani Girls Secondary School alumni
University of Dar es Salaam alumni
University of Canberra alumni
Alumni of the University of Sheffield
University of Natal alumni
Academic staff of the University of Dar es Salaam